The C.P. Shipley House was a historic building located in Mason City, Iowa, United States.  Clinton Pardes Shipley (1851-1936) was a native of Baltimore County, Maryland. He married Margaret A. McMillin (1853-1940) in Mason City on November 17, 1875.  The two-story Prairie School house, completed in 1913, had a stucco exterior, a broad hip roof and overhanging eaves.  It was listed on the National Register of Historic Places in 1980.  The house has subsequently been torn down.  The Globe Gazette building is now on the property.

References

Houses completed in 1913
Prairie School architecture in Iowa
Houses in Mason City, Iowa
National Register of Historic Places in Mason City, Iowa
Houses on the National Register of Historic Places in Iowa